Mesilla may refer to:

Places
 Mesilla, New Mexico, a town in southern New Mexico, United States
 Mesilla Park, New Mexico, a neighborhood in Las Cruces, New Mexico
 Mesilla Plaza, a plaza in Mesilla, New Mexico
 Mesilla Valley, a valley in New Mexico and Texas
 Mesilla Valley AVA, a wine growing area in New Mexico and Texas
 Mesilla Valley Bosque State Park, a state park in New Mexico
 Mesilla Valley Mall, a mall in Las Cruces, New Mexico
 Mesilla Valley Shale, a geologic formation in New Mexico
 La Mesilla, a village in Guatemala
 La Mesilla, New Mexico, a census-designated place in northern New Mexico

Other
 Mesilla (spider), a spider genus
 Mesilla Diversion Dam, a dam in Texas
 First Battle of Mesilla, an 1861 battle in Mesilla
 Second Battle of Mesilla, an 1862 battle in Mesilla
 Treaty of Mesilla, the Gadsden Purchase agreement between Mexico and United States
 Basilica of San Albino, formerly known as San Albino Church of Mesilla
 Halcones FC, a football club in Huehuetenango, Guatemala, formerly known as Peñarol La Mesilla

See also
 Battle of Mesilla (disambiguation)